The Valiant class is a class of US Navy yard tugboats (YT) that entered service in 2009. These tugs are designed to provide ship assist, barge and general towing, and escort services.

Design
Before committing to a new tug design, Navy Region Northwest upgraded two of the older s, Menominee (YT-807) and Washtucna (YTB-826), with improved power systems and z-drive propulsion units. Experience with these and two other YTBs with improved winch and power equipment lead to the decision to build new tugs.

The Valiant class was designed by Robert Allan Ltd. and derived from their Z-Tech 6000 commercial tugboat design. The prime contractor for the first four class members was Pacific Tugboat Services of Long Beach, California.  The builder was J.M. Martinac Shipbuilding Corp. of Tacoma, Washington. 

Unlike previous classes of navy tugboats, the Valiant class employs z-drive propulsion units manufactured by Schottel. These SRP 1012 drive units can be turned through 360 degrees to provide thrust in any direction.  The z-drive propulsion and the unique hull shape allow this class of tug to have roughly the same bollard pull ratings ahead, as astern, .  The z-drive propulsion units are powered by  Caterpillar Marine 3512C V12 diesel engines.

For towing, Valiant-class tugs are able to run stern-first using the JonRie InterTech hydraulic bow winch. This "tractor" mode of operation is accommodated with a stern profile that is higher than the bow profile.

An electric powered tug is being considered as a way for the Navy to reach its 2020 fossil fuel reduction goals.

Valiant-class tugs have an extendable, pivoting brow for use when personnel transfers are required. There are four state rooms, 2 singles for the chief engineer and the tug master, and two doubles for the other crew members. There is also a galley and mess area.  The deck house is well insulated to reduce vibration and sound levels in the accommodations areas. The pilot house is windowed all around.

Ships in the class

References 

 

Auxiliary ship classes of the United States Navy